The Kit McClure Band is an all-female big band and jazz combo begun by Kit McClure in 1982 at The Ritz in New York City.  It eventually caught the attention of Cab Calloway and was signed to Island Records, where it toured with Robert Palmer for two years, playing to sold-out crowds at Radio City Music Hall and Garden State Arts Center, followed by eight tours of Japan.  The band released its first album, Some Like It Hot,  on its own label, Redhot Records, in 1990.  The follow-up, Burning, in 1995, was produced by Teo Macero.

In 2004, and 2006, the band released a pair of albums in tribute to the International Sweethearts of Rhythm, a 1940s big band consisting entirely of women, which, for much of its existence, was all-black.  The second of these was released in conjunction with Motéma Music and Redeye Distribution.  Both albums, The Sweethearts Project and Just the Thing:  The Sweethearts Project Revisited feature exclusively material that was performed by the International Sweethearts of Rhythm, but were entirely re-imagined in a more contemporary style.

In 2005, The Kit McClure Band received the Excellence in Small Business Award from Mayor Michael Bloomberg.

Lineup
Kit McClure, tenor saxophone, alto saxophone
Lakecia Benjamin, alto saxophone
Lisa Parrott, alto saxophone
Tia Fuller, alto saxophone
Erica Von Kleist, alto saxophone
Kristy Norter, tenor sax
Claire Daly, baritone sax
Liesl Whitaker, lead trumpet
Barbara Laronga, trumpet
Laurie Frink, trumpet
Tanya Darby, trumpet
Britta Langsjoen, trombone
Jennifer Krupa, trombone
Cathy Harley, piano
Jill McCarron, piano
Nicki Parrott, bass
Kim Clarke, bass
Barbara Merjan, drums
L. Olivia Sci, drums
Bernice Brooks, drums
Sue Hadjopoulos, percussion
Karen Jones, percussion

External links
Official Site
Kit McClure Band at Motéma Music
Kit McClure Band at Maximum Talent
The Sweethearts Project at All About Jazz

Musical groups established in 1982
American women jazz musicians
1982 establishments in New York City
Big bands
Musical groups from New York City
American jazz ensembles from New York City